Sir Sydney Herbert Holcroft Henn  (4 December 1861 – 21 October 1936) was a Conservative Party  Member of Parliament for Blackburn from 1922 to 1929.

Henn was the son of Rev. John Henn, honorary Canon of Manchester. His younger brother, Percy Henn, became a noted Australian educationalist. After his education in England, Henn worked in Chile for 30 years for Duncan, Fox & Co., founded by David Duncan. He returned to England to retire, but resumed working during the First World War as director of army priority at the War Office from 1917 to 1919, and then director of Disposal Board at the Ministry of Munitions. He was appointed a Knight Commander of the Order of the British Empire in the 1918 Birthday Honours for his services during the war. Henn died in a London hospital, age 74, after falling and breaking his thigh in two places and contracting pneumonia.

Henn's nephew, Guy Henn, was a member of parliament in Western Australia.

References

External links 
 

1861 births
1936 deaths
Conservative Party (UK) MPs for English constituencies
UK MPs 1922–1923
UK MPs 1923–1924
UK MPs 1924–1929
Knights Commander of the Order of the British Empire
Politics of Blackburn with Darwen
Deaths from pneumonia in England